Labordea is a genus of moths in the subfamily Lymantriinae. The genus was erected by Paul Griveaud in 1976.

Species
Some species of this genus are:

 Labordea chalcoptera (Collenette, 1936)
 Labordea hedilacea (Collenette, 1936)
 Labordea leucolineata Griveaud, 1977
 Labordea malgassica (Kenrick, 1914)
 Labordea marmor (Mabille, 1880)
 Labordea prasina (Butler, 1882)
 Labordea suarezi Griveaud, 1977

References

Lymantriinae